WWRD-LP was a low-power commercial television station licensed to Dayton, Ohio, broadcasting locally on channel 32. Founded December 8, 1989 and until 2021 licensed to Centerville, the station was owned by Life Broadcasting Network.

By mid-September 2007, the station had affiliated with the Gospel Music Channel.

Summer 2008, WWRD-LP moved from channel 55 at 10 kW to channel 32 at 13 kW.

At some point prior to mid-June 2011, the station switched affiliation from the Gospel Music Channel to the Retro Television Network.

On April 14, 2012, the station's general manager, Randall Hulsmeyer, announced plans to move the station's operations to Springfield. Hulsmeyer stated that he hoped to add more locally produced programming to WWRD-LP, including a new, weekly Springfield-based show titled Our Town, Our Time, which began airing on April 22. In December, the station moved into a new studio in the former Credit Life building in downtown Springfield. No plans have been announced to move the station's transmitter or to change its city of license.

At some point prior to early July 2013, the station affiliated with the revival of The Nashville Network. Around the same time, the station's branding was changed to "Local TV 4 me!", despite no apparent connection to any channel 4, be it broadcast, cable or satellite. The Nashville Network became Heartland in October 2013.

At some point prior to early February 2016, the station affiliated with ZUUS Country, which  became The Country Network in January 2016.

Although WWRD-LP had apparently not converted from its analog signal to the applied-for digital channel 42 as of June 2018, the station was scheduled to move to digital channel 10, as part of the FCC's spectrum reallocation process. It lost its carriage on Spectrum cable systems on November 19, 2021.

On December 21, 2021, Life Broadcasting Network surrendered WWRD-LP's license to the Federal Communications Commission, who cancelled it the same day.

See also

Channel 32 low-power TV stations in the United States
List of television stations in Ohio 
List of television stations in Ohio (by channel number)
List of television stations in the United States by call sign (initial letter W)

References

External links
Life Broadcasting Network

WRD-LP
Television channels and stations established in 1989
1989 establishments in Ohio
Defunct television stations in the United States
Television channels and stations disestablished in 2021
2021 disestablishments in Ohio
WRD-LP